Zakovat is an intellectual game since 2001. The presenter of Zakovat is Abdurasul Abdullayev. Zakovat was formed based on the russian intellectual game show "What? Where? When?". Zakovat TV show had initially been presented on TV channel "Yoshlar", then was presented on TV channel "Uzbekistan", is currently presented on TV channel "Milliy".

The international alternatives of the Zakovat

References

Student quiz television series